The New Payments Platform (NPP), operated by New Payments Platform Australia Ltd (NPPA) is an industry-wide payments platform for Australia, national infrastructure for fast, flexible, data rich payments in Australia. It was first made accessible to the general public on 13 February 2018 with the launch of PayID, a simple addressing capability, and Osko, the first NPP overlay service, operated by BPAY. As of 2020, more than 60 Australian banks have adopted the system.

The new instant payment platform for real-time low value payments was in response to the Reserve Bank of Australia's Payment System Board’s Conclusions to the Strategic Review of the Innovation in Payments System publication. The NPP was announced in July 2013 by APCA. In December 2014, the Program proceeded to the third phase, "design, build and test".  In 2015 a contract was signed with SWIFT to design, build and operate the platform.

In September 2021, the Australian Competition and Consumer Commission (ACCC) authorised a proposed merger of the New Payments Platform with Eftpos and BPAY Pty Ltd.

Mandated Payment Service and PayTo 

The Mandated Payment Service is now known as PayTo. It is a system for enabling "withdrawals" on the NPP. The NPP does not inherently support "withdrawals", so the service provides an overlay allowing the "withdrawing" party to create a payment order and authorisation request.`

PayID and PayTo routing 
PayID is NPP's addressing service to enable payments. Its PayTo facility allows for payments to be sent by a user to a PayID. The following chart compares PayID mobile payments via NPP to electronic payments, or bank transfers.

PayID will coexist with the BSB and account number addressing scheme.

Osko 
Osko is owned and operated by BPAY, and operates on the NPP as an overlay service. It uses PayID as a reference for payments. Payments are instant to accounts that have been transferred to previously.

In the Spring of 2021, BPAY attributed a change in  NPPA strategy (particularly the announcement of MPS, the Mandated Payment Service), as the cause of write-down in the value of their Osko business.

Online Scams 

PayID has been noted in Australia as a vehicle for online scammers on social media marketplaces.

References 

Banking in Australia
Financial services companies of Australia
Online financial services companies of Australia
Financial services companies established in 2013
Computer-related introductions in 2013
Payment networks
Payment service providers